Lyndon Svi Byers (born February 29, 1964) is a Canadian former professional ice hockey player. Byers played in the National Hockey League (NHL) for parts of ten seasons with the Boston Bruins and San Jose Sharks, earning a reputation as one of the league's toughest enforcers. He is the cousin of Dane Byers.

Playing career
Born in Nipawin, Saskatchewan, Byers spent a year with the Notre Dame Hounds before beginning his major junior career in 1981 with the Regina Pats of the Western Hockey League (WHL). The following year, the Boston Bruins selected him with a second-round pick (39th overall) at the 1982 NHL Entry Draft. His gritty style earned him a spot with Team Canada at the 1984 World Junior Championships in Nyköping, Sweden. Byers showed promise by scoring 32 goals in each of the next two seasons with Regina, but it was his 153 and 154 penalty minutes in each of those seasons that would be a better measure of his future professional career.

Joining the Bruins at the end of the 1983–84 season, he scored two goals and four assists for six points while amassing 32 PIMs. Bouncing back and forth between the parent club and the minors, his best statistical season came in 1987–88, when he registered 10 goals and 14 assists for 24 points while amassing 249 penalty minutes in 53 games.

Byers signed as a free-agent with the San Jose Sharks on November 7, 1992, where he finished his NHL career in 1992–93, before ending his professional playing career with the International Hockey League (IHL)'s Minnesota Moose in 1994–1995. He scored 28 goals and 43 assists for 71 points and amassed 1,081 PIMs in 279 NHL games over ten seasons.

Entertainment career
Shortly after his playing career, Byers returned to the Boston area and became a member of the Hill Man Morning Show on radio station WAAF-FM, where he was an on air personality and sports specialist for 23 years before the show ended. Byers moved to the afternoon slot along with co-host Mike Hsu.  On September 3, 2019, Byers unexpectedly quit the Hsu & LB show in a tearful goodbye that he gave on the air seconds before walking out of the studio. WAAF closed up shop less than six months later. LB made an appearance on air on the last day of station broadcasting.

Byers has made several appearances on the FX dramedy Rescue Me with well-known Bruins fan Denis Leary, as well as fellow former Bruins Cam Neely and Phil Esposito. He had a cameo appearance in the films Shallow Hal and Stuck On You as well. He was also featured on the Season One finale of Bar Rescue on Spike TV. Byers and Neely also appeared in the music video for the song "Hole Hearted" by Boston hard rock group Extreme.

Career statistics

References

External links

1964 births
Living people
Boston Bruins draft picks
Boston Bruins players
Canadian expatriate ice hockey players in the United States
Canadian ice hockey forwards
Hershey Bears players
Ice hockey people from Saskatchewan
Kansas City Blades players
Maine Mariners players
Milwaukee Admirals (IHL) players
Moncton Golden Flames players
People from Nipawin, Saskatchewan
Regina Pats players
San Diego Gulls (IHL) players
San Jose Sharks players